The Bartek Oak is one of the oldest oak trees in Poland. It grows in Zagnańsk near Kielce in the Świętokrzyskie Mountains. Its age, previously estimated at up to 1200 years, has recently been established to be 686 years (in 2016), with a corer used to extract a sample for a ring count. An accurate count is impossible, as Bartek's interior has hollowed with age. There are several older trees in Poland, both oaks and yews (some over 1000 years old), yet none of them have matched Bartek's fame.

The 33,5-metre tall Bartek measures 970 cm at CBH (circumference at breast height) and 13.5 metres in girth at its base. Its crown spreads about 40 metres. King Casimir III (1310–1370) is known to have held court under Bartek. King Jan III Sobieski rested under the oak on his way back from the Battle of Vienna (1683). He reputedly hid a Turkish sabre, an arquebus and a bottle of wine inside it to commemorate the victory.

The oak is still alive, but is in decline. In 1829 it had 14 main branches, today only 8 are left. In the 1920s the hollow inside the trunk was covered with limestone. The limestone was removed in the 1960s, replaced with resin-based filling and covered with bark. The living sapwood is very thin (5–20 cm). The weakened trunk has begun to lean toward the heavy branches.

See also 
 Bażyński Oak
 Jagiełło Oak
 The Giant Plane
 List of individual trees

References 
  4. Battlefield 1 (Melee Weapon) as the Bartek Bludgeon

External links
Poland.gov: Bartek appears in the introduction to the government page on Poland's geography.
Bernard Konarski, "Świetopelk Oak in Krepkowice is 621 years old": Bartek oak's age also established
 360° picture of Bartek
 Gmina Zagnańsk More information about "Bartek" (in Polish)
Oaks in Bialowieza
Świętopełk tree

Individual oak trees
Landmarks in Poland
Geography of Świętokrzyskie Voivodeship
Natural monuments of Poland
Individual trees in Poland